Browina  is a village in the administrative district of Gmina Kozłowo, within Nidzica County, Warmian-Masurian Voivodeship, in northern Poland. 

The village has a population of 180.

References

Browina